The Mendel Pass ( or , ,  or  ) is a 1,362 metre-high mountain pass between the provinces of Trentino and South Tyrol in Italy. 

The pass is accessed by the pass road, which begins in the town of Fondo in the Non Valley and ends southwest of the city of Bolzano, and the Mendel Funicular, which connects the Überetsch plateau with the pass. The pass road, SS 42, has a maximum grade of 12%, but is relatively straight. It is open year-round, but trailers are prohibited.

The pass road was built between 1880 and 1885, and the first hotel at the pass was built in 1890. In 1900, a tram was built from the town of Kaltern.

The instability of the cliffs overhanging the road is a cause of concern, and work was undertaken in 2005 to stabilize them. The pass is under constant observation, particularly in the spring, when thawing and refreezing causes danger of slides.

See also
 List of highest paved roads in Europe
 List of mountain passes

External links 

Mountain passes of the Alps
Mountain passes of South Tyrol
Nonsberg Group